Equus is a play by Peter Shaffer written in 1973, telling the story of a psychiatrist who attempts to treat a young man who has a pathological religious fascination with horses.

Shaffer was inspired to write Equus when he heard of a crime involving a 17-year-old who blinded six horses in a small town in Suffolk. He set out to construct a fictional account of what might have caused the incident, without knowing any of the details of the crime. The play's action is something of a detective story, involving the attempts of the child psychiatrist Dr. Martin Dysart to understand the cause of the boy's (Alan Strang) actions while wrestling with his own sense of purpose.

The original stage production ran at the National Theatre in London between 1973 and 1975, directed by John Dexter. Alec McCowen played Dysart, and Peter Firth played Alan Strang. Later came the Broadway productions that starred Anthony Hopkins as Dysart (later played by Richard Burton, Leonard Nimoy, and Anthony Perkins) and from the London production, Peter Firth as Alan. When Firth left for Broadway, Dai Bradley took over the role of Alan in the London production, playing opposite Michael Jayston as Dr. Dysart. Tom Hulce replaced Firth during the Broadway run. The Broadway production ran for 1,209 performances. Marian Seldes appeared in every single performance of the Broadway run, first in the role of Hesther and then as Dora. Shaffer also adapted his play for a 1977 film of the same name.

Numerous other issues inform the narrative. Most important are religious and ritual sacrifice themes, as well as the manner in which character Alan Strang constructs a personal theology involving the horses and the supreme godhead, "Equus". Alan sees the horses as representative of God and confuses his adoration of his "God" with sexual attraction. Also important is Shaffer's examination of the conflict between personal values and satisfaction and societal mores, expectations, and institutions. By employing classical structure, themes, and characterisation, Shaffer dramatizes the conflict between Apollonian and Dionysian values and systems in human life.

Plot summary

Act 1

Martin Dysart is a psychiatrist in a psychiatric hospital. He begins with a monologue in which he outlines the case of 17-year-old Alan Strang, who blinded six horses. He also divulges his feeling that his occupation is not all that he wishes it to be and his feelings of dissatisfaction and disappointment about his barren life. Dysart finds that the supply of troubled young people for him to "adjust" back into "normal" living is never-ending, but he doubts the value of treating these youths, since they will simply return to a dull, normal life that lacks any commitment and "worship" (a recurring theme). He comments that Alan Strang's crime was extreme, but adds that just such extremity is needed to break free from the chains of existence.

A court magistrate, Hesther Saloman, visits Dysart, believing that he has the skills to help Alan come to terms with what he did. At the hospital, Dysart has a great deal of difficulty making any kind of headway with Alan, who at first responds to questioning by singing TV advertising jingles.

Dysart reveals a dream he has had, in a Homeric Grecian setting, in which he is a public official presiding over a mass ritual sacrifice. One after another, he slices open the abdomens of hundreds of children, and pulls out their entrails. He becomes disgusted with what he is doing, but fears being murdered in the same manner if discovered as a "non-believer" by the other priests, so does not stop. Eventually the other priests, aware of his misgivings, grab the knife from his hand—at which point he awakens from the dream.

Dysart interviews Alan's parents. He learns that, from an early age, Alan has been receiving conflicting views on religion from his parents. Alan's mother, Dora, is a devout Christian who has read to him daily from the Bible. This practice has antagonized Alan's father Frank, a non-believer.

Slowly, Dysart makes contact with Alan by playing a game where each of them asks a question, which must be answered honestly.

Dysart learns that Frank, concerned that Alan was taking far too much interest in the more violent aspects of the Bible, destroyed a violent picture of the Crucifixion that Alan had hung at the foot of his bed. Alan replaced the picture with one of a horse, with large, staring eyes.

Alan reveals to Dysart that, during his youth, his attraction to horses came about by way of his mother's biblical tales, a horse story that she had read to him, Western movies, and his grandfather's interest in horses and riding. Alan's sexual education began with his mother, who told him he could find true love and contentment by way of religious devotion and marriage. During this time, Alan also begins to develop a sexual attraction to horses, desiring to pet their thick coats, feel their muscular bodies, and smell their sweat. Alan reveals to Dysart that he had first encountered a horse at age six, on the beach. A rider approached him, and took him up on the horse. Alan was visibly excited, but his parents found him and Frank pulled him violently off the horse. The horse rider scoffed at the father and rode off.

Dysart hypnotizes Alan and, during the hypnosis, reveals elements of his terrifying dream of the ritual murder of children. Dysart begins to jog Alan's memory by filling in blanks and asking questions. Alan reveals that he wants to help the horses by removing the bit, which enslaves them.

After turning 17, Alan took a job working in a shop selling electrical goods, where he met Jill Mason, an outgoing and free-spirited young woman. She visits the shop wanting to purchase blades for horse-clippers. Alan was instantly interested when he discovered that Jill has such close contact with horses after she tells him that she works for a local stable owner. Jill suggested that Alan work for the owner of the stables, Harry Dalton. Alan agrees.

Dysart meets with Dalton, who tells him that he first held Alan to be a model worker, since he kept the stables immaculately clean and grooms the horses, including one named Nugget. Through Dysart's questioning, it becomes clear that Alan is erotically fixated on Nugget (or "Equus") and secretly takes him for midnight rides, bareback and naked. Alan also envisions himself as a king, on the godhead Equus, both destroying their enemies.

Act 2

Dysart gives Alan a placebo "truth pill". Revealing a tryst with Jill, he begins to re-enact the event:

Jill, who has taken an interest in Alan, asks him to take her to a porno theatre. While there, they run into Alan's father, Frank. Alan is traumatized, particularly when he realizes that his father is lying to justify his presence in the theatre. However, this allows Alan to realize that sex is a natural thing for all men, even his father. Alan walks Jill home after they leave and she convinces Alan to come to the stables with her.

Once there, Jill seduces Alan and the two undress and attempt to have sex. However, Alan hesitates when he hears the horses making noises in the stables beneath, which he blames as the reason for his inability to get an erection. Jill tries to ask Alan what the problem is, but he shouts at her to leave. After Jill dresses and walks out of the stables, the still nude Alan begs the horses for forgiveness, as he sees the horses as God-like figures. "Mine!...You're mine!...I am yours and you are mine!" cries Equus through Dysart's voice, but then he becomes threatening: "The Lord thy God is a jealous God," Equus/Dysart seethes, "He sees you, he sees you forever and ever, Alan. He sees you!...He sees you!" Alan screams, "God seest!" and then he says "No more. No more, Equus!" Alan then uses a steel spike to blind the six horses in the stable, whose eyes have "seen" his very soul.

In the final scene, Dysart delivers a monologue questioning the fundamentals of his practice and whether his methods will help Alan, as the effect of his treatment will make him "normal", but at the cost of his humanity.

Original Broadway production
The play opened on Broadway at the Plymouth Theatre on 24 October 1974, ending on 11 September 1976.  It then opened at the Helen Hayes Theatre on 5 October 1976, ending on 2 October 1977, for a total of 1,209 performances.

Film adaptation 

Shaffer adapted the play for a 1977 film starring Richard Burton, Peter Firth, Eileen Atkins, Colin Blakely, Joan Plowright, and Jenny Agutter, directed by Sidney Lumet. Unlike stage productions, where the horses are portrayed by human actors, often muscular men wearing tribal-style masks, Lumet did not believe this could adequately be done in a film version, concluding a degree of realism was required, "because the reality he [Alan] was being watched he was going to create the dilemma within him."

Comparing the film to the play, English Professor James M. Welsh felt using real horses in the film was understandable, but argued the outdoor scenes infringed on the "abstract theatrical design" that gave the play its creativity. Welsh also felt the explicit blinding was "potentially repulsive," and "much of the spirit of the play is lost as a consequence."

Revivals 

The first Midwest U.S. production of Equus opened March 1978 in Lansing, Michigan, at Boarshead Theatre. Directed by John Peakes, it featured Richard Thomsen as Dysart, David Kropp as Alan, Carmen Decker as Dora, and Lisa Hodge as Jill. Local controversy over the nude scene was largely mitigated by casting a married couple as Jill and Alan. This production went on to win Boarshead Theatre's annual awards for Best Production and Best Supporting Actor (Kropp).

The Lovegrove Alley Theatre of Baltimore staged a production of Equus in 1979. The production starred a pre-Broadway Charles S. Dutton in the role of Dysart. Director Brad Mays did double duty in the role of Alan Strang. A young actress named Lauren Raher played Jill Mason, and her real-life mother Rhona Raher portrayed Dora, Alan's mother.

West End producers David Pugh and Dafydd Rogers revived Equus in 2007, starring Richard Griffiths, Daniel Radcliffe, and Joanna Christie in the leading roles. The production was directed by Thea Sharrock, and opened in February 2007 at the Gielgud Theatre. The production attracted press attention since both Radcliffe and Griffiths starred in the Harry Potter film series (as Harry Potter and Vernon Dursley, respectively). In particular, the casting of seventeen-year-old Radcliffe triggered some controversy since the role of Alan Strang required him to appear nude onstage. Radcliffe insisted that the nude scene was not "gratuitous", and that he should portray the character and the scene as called for by the script. The 2007 West End revival was subsequently transferred to Broadway, running at the Broadhurst Theatre through 8 February 2009. Radcliffe and Griffiths reprised their roles, and Thea Sharrock returned as director. The cast also included Kate Mulgrew, Anna Camp, Carolyn McCormick, Lorenzo Pisoni, T. Ryder Smith, Graeme Malcolm, and Sandra Shipley, with Collin Baja, Tyrone Jackson, Spencer Liff, Adesola Osakalumi, and Marc Spaulding. Radcliffe eventually received a nomination for the Drama Desk Award for Outstanding Actor in a Play.

The first illustrated edition of the play text was produced as a large-format artist's book by the Old Stile Press, with images and an afterword by the British artist Clive Hicks-Jenkins, in 2009.

City Lights Theater Company of San Jose, California revived Equus in March 2011. This production, featuring actors Sean Gilvary as Alan Strang and Steve Lambert as Martin Dysart, received rave reviews. The San Jose Mercury News labelled Gilvary and Lambert as "haunting," stating Gilvary "...exposing emotions and epidermis, rides bareback in every sense. He gradually manages to make a rather unattractive young creature seem not only sympathetic but redeemable while retaining his hostility and humanity." StarkInsider rated the production 4.5 out of 5 stars, calling Lambert "superb" and having a "pitch-perfect performance," while calling Gilvary "dazzling" and having "a preternatural ability to inhabit the very soul of his character. Like the troubled teen that he portrays, both he and Strang possess a passion for something that is an inseparable part of their personality." This production received a Standout Classic Production Award by Silicon Valley Small Theatre Awards.

Equus was revived in Houston, for a limited run in July 2014 at Frenetic Theater. The production was largely funded by donations on Kickstarter and was well received by critics and audiences alike. Broadway World called the production 'dark, daunting and sensual' and commending its 'stellar cast'. Houston Press said it was 'astonishingly good... a must see' while Culturemap listed the show as one of the hottest shows of the year.

Awards and nominations

Original Broadway production

References

Further reading

External links 

 
 
 
 Audience get up close and personal for Harry Potter star's nude debut. The London Standard, 12 October 2006. Dead link. 
 Wolfe, G. Enjoying Equus: Jouissance in Shaffer’s Play. PSYART: A Hyperlink Journal for the Psychological Study of the Arts. 15 December 2009.
 Mahmood, R. Equus: Saving the best for last. The Express Tribune 12 March 2012.

1973 plays
Broadway plays
Drama Desk Award-winning plays
British plays adapted into films
Plays by Peter Shaffer
Plays set in England
Royal National Theatre
Tony Award-winning plays
Diseases and disorders in theatre
Zoophilia in culture
Nudity in theatre and dance